Mohamed Hassan (born 1 July 1997) is an Egyptian fencer. He competed in the men's team foil event at the 2020 Summer Olympics.

References

External links
 

1997 births
Living people
Egyptian male foil fencers
Olympic fencers of Egypt
Fencers at the 2020 Summer Olympics
People from Tabuk, Saudi Arabia
20th-century Egyptian people
21st-century Egyptian people